Michálek is a Czech surname. The following people have this surname:

 Adam Michálek, Czech rower
 Anthony Michalek (born Michálek, 1878–1916), Bohemian former U.S. Representative from Illinois.
 Libor Michálek, Czech politician
 Milan Michálek (born 1984), Czech professional ice hockey player, brother of Zbyněk.
 Tomáš Michálek (born 1977), Czech footballer.
 Vladimír Michálek (born 1956), Czech film director and screenwriter.
 Zbyněk Michálek (born 1982), Czech professional ice hockey player, brother of Milan.

Michalek is a Slovak variant, also used as an anglicisation of Michálek and Michałek. The following people have this surname:
 Chris Michalek (born 1971), American harmonica player.
 Miroslav Michalek (born 1965), Slovak former ice hockey player, who played at the 1994 Winter Olympics.
 Nikolaus Michalek (born 1940), Austrian politician, Minister of Justice from 1990–2000.

Michałek is a Polish variant. The following people have this surname:
 Aneta Michałek (born 1991), Polish pair skater.

Michalke is a German variant. The following people have this surname:
 Andreas Michalke (born 1966), German cartoonist
 Kai Michalke (born 1976), German professional footballer
 Reiner Michalke (born 1956), German artistic director of the mœrs festival, a German jazz festival

References

Czech-language surnames
Surnames
Surnames from given names